The Glass Key, released in 1935, was based upon the 1931 suspense novel The Glass Key by Dashiell Hammett, directed by Frank Tuttle, starring George Raft and featuring Edward Arnold, Claire Dodd, Guinn "Big Boy" Williams and Ray Milland. Ann Sheridan has a brief speaking role as Raft's character's nurse in their first film together.

The film was remade in 1942, with Alan Ladd in Raft's role, Brian Donlevy and Veronica Lake in the roles previously played by Arnold and Dodd, and William Bendix in Guinn Williams' part.

Plot
Paul Madvig (Edward Arnold) controls crime and politics in the city, helped by the brains and brawn of Ed Beaumont (George Raft). As he throws his support behind Janet Henry's (Claire Dodd) father, in a political campaign, Paul also plans to marry her.

Janet's brother Taylor (Ray Milland) is a gambler heavily in debt to O'Rory (Robert Gleckler), a gangster whose club Paul intends to put out of business. Taylor, who has been romancing Paul's younger sister Opal (Rosalind Keith), is found dead. The temperamental Paul falls under suspicion.

Ed pretends to betray Paul while offering to work for O'Rory's organization. He is beaten by Jeff (Guinn Williams), a brutal thug who works for O'Rory, and has to flee for his life.

Paul is going to face murder charges, but Janet knows who is really behind her brother's death. It's up to Ed to get her to reveal the truth.

Cast
 George Raft as Ed Beaumont
 Edward Arnold as Paul Madvig
 Claire Dodd as Janet Henry
 Rosalind Keith as Opal Madvig 
 Charles Richman as Senator John T. Henry
 Robert Gleckler as Shad O'Rory
 Guinn Williams as Jeff
 Ray Milland as Taylor Henry
 Tammany Young as Clarkie
 Emma Dunn as Mom Madvig
 Charles C. Wilson as District Attorney Edward J. Farr
 Mack Gray as Duke
 Ann Sheridan as Nurse
 George Reed as Midnight (uncredited)

Production
In September 1930, Paramount paid $25,000 for the film rights to the novel when it was in galleys. The following year Paramount announced Gary Cooper would star in a version called Graft but it was not made.

In August 1934, Paramount announced Frank Tuttle would direct George Raft in an adaptation of The Glass Key.

Elissa Landi was once announced for the female lead before being replaced by Claire Dodd. Filming started on 25 February 1935.

Ann Sheridan was billed as "Nurse" at the bottom of the cast list at the end of the film for her brief speaking role with Raft.

Reception
Writing for The Spectator, Graham Greene described the film as "unimaginatively gangster" and grouped it with the contemporary comedy No More Ladies to describe both as "second rate" and "transient". Nevertheless, the film became one of Raft's biggest box-office hits of the 1930s.

References

External links
 
 
 
The Glass Key at BFI
 
 
Review of film at Variety

1935 films
American black-and-white films
1935 crime drama films
Films based on American novels
Film noir
Paramount Pictures films
Films directed by Frank Tuttle
Films based on works by Dashiell Hammett
American crime drama films
Films with screenplays by Kathryn Scola
Films with screenplays by Kubec Glasmon
1930s English-language films
1930s American films